Dennis White may refer to:

 Sir Dennis White (colonial administrator) (1910–1983), British High Commissioner for Brunei
 Dennis White (footballer) (1948–2019), English footballer
 Dennis White (police commissioner), American police officer, commissioner of the Boston Police Department
 Dennis L. A. White, American stage and screen actor
 Denny White, American politician in Ohio

See also
 Static Revenger, American record producer and songwriter also known as Dennis White and Latroit